This is a list of notable people from Charlotte County, New Brunswick. Although not everyone in this list was born in Charlotte County, they all live or have lived in Charlotte County and have had significant connections to the communities.

See also
List of people from New Brunswick

Charlotte